Lee Evans may refer to:

Sports
 Lee Evans (American football) (born 1981), American football player
 Lee Evans (darts player) (born 1988), British dart player
 Lee Evans (footballer) (born 1994), Welsh association football player
 Lee Evans (sprinter) (1947–2021), American sprinter

Others
 Lee Evans (comedian) (born 1964), English comedian and actor
 Lee Evans (politician) (born 1961), Australian politician
 Lee G. R. Evans, British birdwatcher
 Lee Latchford-Evans (born 1975), musician and former member of the band Steps